Magdalena: a Musical Adventure is a folk operetta in two acts with music by Heitor Villa-Lobos, original book by Frederick Hazlitt Brennan and Homer Curran, and lyrics and musical adaptations by Robert Wright and George Forrest.

Performance history
Magdalena premiered at the Los Angeles Civic Light Opera on 26 July 1948, pursuant to a commission from Edwin Lester, president of that organization. Arthur Kay conducted Irra Petina, Dorothy Sarnoff, John Raitt, Hugo Haas, Gerhard Pechner, A. Garcia, Melva Niles, Henry Reese, Ferdinand Hilt, J. Arthur, Betty Huff, Christine Matsios, Leonard Morganthaler, John Schickling, Lorraine Miller, Gene Curtsinger, Patrick Kirk, Betty Brusher, and Jack Cole (soloists). Jules Dassin directed, Jack Cole was the choreographer, assisted by Gwen Verdon, and the chorus was prepared by Robert  Zeller. Broadway veterans Howard Bay (settings and lighting) and Irene Sharaff (costumes) were also part of the creative team. It was also presented in San Francisco at the Curran Theatre (San Francisco Light Opera) for several performances beginning August 16, 1948. The same production opened in New York City at the Ziegfeld Theatre on September 20, 1948, and closed on December 4 after 88 performances. Raitt, Sarnoff, and Haas reprised their roles. No recording was made due to a strike.

Magdalena was revived in concert form under conductor Evans Haile on November 24, 1987, at Alice Tully Hall in New York's Lincoln Center; a recording with a slightly different cast was made in RCA's studios in 1988 and issued by CBS (later Sony) in 1989 (ASIN: B0000026QF). In 1992, Ohio Light Opera, a summer festival in Wooster, Ohio, presented a fully-staged revival, the first since 1948. The work was performed in Australia in the 1990s as part of the Opera Festival in Ballarat, Victoria, again under Haile. More recently the Théâtre du Châtelet in Paris announced a production to open in May 2010, with Kate Whoriskey directing and Warren Adams supplying choreography.

Critical reception 
The play received a withering review from Brooks Atkinson of the New York Times, who called it "one of the most overpoweringly dull musical dramas of all time" and compared its slow plot to "being hit over the head with a sledge hammer repeatedly all evening," adding: "It hurts." He was kinder to Villa-Lobos's score: "Disentangled from the appalling libretto and lyrics of 'Magdalena,' the score might be stimulating, especially since the orchestrations are unhackneyed and an accomplished singing actress, like Irra Petina, can give her numbers brilliance and eloquence."

Other critics were far more positive. John Chapman in the New York Daily News, while dismissing the book as "secondary," called the play "a bold and stunning departure in the musical theater ... a flaming, opulent, disturbing and imaginative work which does not fit into any of the standard patterns." He praised Villa-Lobos' score as "busy, immensely intricate and strangely, fascinatingly orchestrated."

Musical numbers
As presented in 1948
Act I
 Women Weaving
 Petacal
 The Seed of God
 The Omen Bird
 My Bus and I
 The Emerald
 The Civilized People
 Food For Thought
 Come to Colombia
 Plan It by the Planets
 Bon Soir, Paris
 Travel, Travel, Travel
 Magdalena
 The Broken Pianolita
 Greeting
 The River Song
 Chivor Dance
 My Bus and I (Reprise)
 The Forbidden Orchid
Act II
 Ceremonial
 The Singing Tree
 Lost
 Freedom!
 Vals de Espana
 The Emerald (Reprise)
 Piece de Resistance
 The Broken Bus
 The Seed of God (Reprise)

References

Further reading
Garcia, Thomas George Caracas. "American Views of Brazilian Musical Culture: Villa-Lobos's Magdalena and Brazilian Popular Music". Journal of Popular Culture [serial online] 37 no. 4 (May 2004): 634-647. Available from: Academic Search Complete, Ipswich, MA. Paywalled.
Cadenhead F. "Magdelena". American Record Guide [serial online]. 73, no 5 (September 2010): 43-44. Available from: Academic Search Complete, Ipswich, MA.
 Peppercorn, Lisa M. "Villa-Lobos's Stage Works". Revue belge de Musicologie / Belgisch Tijdschrift voor Muziekwetenschap 36 (1982–84): 175-84.

External links
Internet Broadway Database listing
New York Times review, November 25, 1987
Time Magazine review, October 4, 1948
Red Deer Public Library page about the play

Compositions by Heitor Villa-Lobos
Operas by Heitor Villa-Lobos
English-language operas
Operas
1948 musicals
Broadway musicals